Furman is a surname.

Notable people with the name include:

 Ashrita Furman (born 1954), American holder of more than 160 Guinness world records
 Dean Furman (born 1988), South African footballer
 Dmitri Furman (1943–2011), Russian political scientist
 Ezra Furman (born 1986), American singer and songwriter
 Furman Bisher (1918–2012), American sports writer
 Gabriel Furman (state senator) (1800–1854), New York politician and historian
 Jason Furman (born 1970), American economist
 Jesse M. Furman (born 1972), Federal judge for the Southern District of New York
 John C. Furman (–1898),  American financier
 Lucy Furman (1870–1958), American writer from Kentucky
 Maayan Furman-Shahaf (born 1986), Israeli high jumper and triple jumper
 Richard Furman (1755–1825), South Carolina Baptist minister, for whom Furman University is named
 Semyon Furman (1920–1978), Soviet chess grandmaster
 Simon Furman (born 1961), British comic book writer
 William Henry Furman, the defendant in the 1972 case of Furman v. Georgia

Occupational surnames